This page describes mining for molecules. Since molecules may be represented by molecular graphs this is strongly related to graph mining and structured data mining.  The main problem is how to represent molecules while discriminating the data instances.  One way to do this is chemical similarity metrics, which has a long tradition in the field of cheminformatics.

Typical approaches to calculate chemical similarities use chemical fingerprints, but this loses the underlying information about the molecule topology.  Mining the molecular graphs directly
avoids this problem. So does the inverse QSAR problem which is preferable for vectorial mappings.

Coding(Moleculei,Moleculeji)

Kernel methods
 Marginalized graph kernel
 Optimal assignment kernel
 Pharmacophore kernel
 C++ (and R) implementation combining
 the marginalized graph kernel between labeled graphs
 extensions of the marginalized kernel
 Tanimoto kernels
 graph kernels based on tree patterns
 kernels based on pharmacophores for 3D structure of molecules

Maximum Common Graph methods
 MCS-HSCS (Highest Scoring Common Substructure (HSCS) ranking strategy for single MCS)
 Small Molecule Subgraph Detector (SMSD)- is a Java-based software library for calculating Maximum Common Subgraph (MCS) between small molecules. This will help us to find similarity/distance between two molecules. MCS is also used for screening drug like compounds by hitting molecules, which share common subgraph (substructure).

Coding(Moleculei)

Molecular query methods
 Warmr
 AGM
 PolyFARM
 FSG
 MolFea
 MoFa/MoSS
 Gaston
 LAZAR
 ParMol (contains MoFa, FFSM, gSpan, and Gaston)
 optimized gSpan
 SMIREP
 DMax
 SAm/AIm/RHC
 AFGen
 gRed
 G-Hash

Methods based on special architectures of neural networks
 BPZ
 ChemNet
 CCS
 MolNet
 Graph machines

See also 
 Molecular Query Language
 Chemical graph theory
QSAR
ADME
partition coefficient

References

Further reading
 Schölkopf, B., K. Tsuda and J. P. Vert: Kernel Methods in Computational Biology, MIT Press, Cambridge, MA, 2004.
 R.O. Duda, P.E. Hart, D.G. Stork, Pattern Classification, John Wiley & Sons, 2001. 
 Gusfield, D., Algorithms on Strings, Trees, and Sequences: Computer Science and Computational Biology, Cambridge University Press, 1997. 
 R. Todeschini, V. Consonni, Handbook of Molecular Descriptors, Wiley-VCH, 2000.

External links
 Small Molecule Subgraph Detector (SMSD) -  is a Java-based software library for calculating Maximum Common Subgraph (MCS) between small molecules.
 5th International Workshop on Mining and Learning with Graphs, 2007
 Overview for 2006
 Molecule mining (basic chemical expert systems)
 ParMol and master thesis documentation - Java - Open source - Distributed mining - Benchmark algorithm library
 TU München - Kramer group
 Molecule mining (advanced chemical expert systems)
 DMax Chemistry Assistant - commercial software
 AFGen - Software for generating fragment-based descriptors

Cheminformatics
Computational chemistry
Data mining